Thomas Winnard (1 September 1909 – February 1986) was an English professional rugby league footballer who played in the 1930s and 1940s.

Playing career

International honours
Tom Winnard won a cap for England while at Bradford Northern in 1937 against France at Thrum Hall, Halifax.

Championship final appearances
Tom Winnard played, and scored a try in St. Helens' 9–5 victory over Huddersfield in the Championship Final during the 1931–32 season at Belle Vue, Wakefield on Saturday 7 May 1932.

County League appearances
Tom Winnard played in St. Helens' victories in the Lancashire County League during the 1929-30 season and 1931-32 season.

Genealogical information

References

External links
Profile at saints.org.uk
Photograph "Tom Winnard" at rlhp.co.uk
Photograph "Tom Winnard playing for England" at rlhp.co.uk

1909 births
1986 deaths
Bradford Bulls players
England national rugby league team players
English rugby league players
Lancashire rugby league team players
Liverpool City (rugby league) players
Place of birth missing
Rugby league centres
St Helens R.F.C. players